Swift Bay is a bay entered west of Jefford Point, on the south side of James Ross Island. It was named by the UK Antarctic Place-names Committee in 2006 in association with Swift Glacier, which flows southward into the bay.

References

Bays of James Ross Island